Mictec Schools is a co-education school located at Ojota, in Lagos State, Nigeria.

Background
Mictec Schools comprises crèche, early learning, primary and secondary school.  It is directed by Micheal O.K Tejuosho. The school runs a hostel accommodation for non-day students. In 2010, the school ended its session with a Christmas party.

See also

 Education in Nigeria
 List of schools in Lagos

References

External links
 , the school's official website

Educational institutions with year of establishment missing
Boarding schools in Nigeria
Co-educational boarding schools
Primary schools in Nigeria
Schools in Lagos
Secondary schools in Lagos State